"No Tell Lover" is a song written by Peter Cetera, Lee Loughnane, and Danny Seraphine for the group Chicago and recorded for their album Hot Streets (1978), with Cetera and Donnie Dacus singing lead vocals. The second single released from that album, it reached No. 14 on the U.S. Billboard Hot 100 chart and No. 5 on the adult contemporary chart.

Cash Box called it a "classy pop single" that tells "a sultry tale of masked love."  Record World said it "has the feel of a classic Chicago ballad."

After "No Tell Lover", Chicago failed to chart a single in the U.S. top 50 for nearly four years, finally breaking their slump with the 1982 No. 1 hit, "Hard to Say I'm Sorry".

Personnel
 Peter Cetera - lead & backing vocals, bass
 Donnie Dacus - lead & backing vocals, electric guitars
 Robert Lamm - Fender Rhodes electric piano, backing vocals
 Danny Seraphine - drums
 Laudir de Oliveira - percussion
 James Pankow - trombone
 Lee Loughnane - trumpet
 Walt Parazaider - tenor saxophone
 Blue Weaver - ARP String Ensemble synthesizer

Chart performance

Weekly charts

Year-end charts

References

1978 singles
Chicago (band) songs
Rock ballads
Songs written by Peter Cetera
Columbia Records singles
1978 songs
Songs written by Lee Loughnane
Song recordings produced by Phil Ramone
Songs written by Danny Seraphine